This is the line-up of Nightwish, an Echo-winning band from Kitee, Finland, formed in 1996 by songwriter/keyboardist Tuomas Holopainen, guitarist Emppu Vuorinen, and former vocalist Tarja Turunen. Nightwish is Finland's most successful band with more than 7 million sold albums worldwide, 1 silver award, 11 gold awards and 30 platinum awards.

Although Nightwish has been prominent in their home country since the release of their first single, "The Carpenter" (1997) and debut album Angels Fall First, they did not achieve worldwide fame until the release of the albums Oceanborn, Wishmaster and Century Child, which were released in 1998, 2000 and 2002 respectively. Their 2004 album, Once, which has sold more than 1.2 million copies, led to Nightwish video clips being shown on MTV in the United States and inclusion of their music in US movie soundtracks. Their biggest US hit single, "Wish I Had an Angel" (2004), made it onto three US film soundtracks as a means to promote their North American tour. The band produced three more singles and two music videos for the album, as well as "Sleeping Sun", from the 2005 "best of" compilation album, Highest Hopes, prior to vocalist Tarja Turunen’s dismissal.

In May 2007, former Alyson Avenue frontwoman, Anette Olzon, was revealed as Turunen’s replacement, and in the autumn, the band released a new album – Dark Passion Play, which has sold more than 1.5 million copies. The supporting tour started on 6 October 2007 and ended on 19 September 2009. A new E.P./live album, Made in Hong Kong (And in Various Other Places), was released in March 2009 as a MCD/DVD.

Nightwish has received eleven awards from both the Emma-gaala Awards, from thirteen nominations, and one Echo Awards from two nominations. Nightwish has also received 2 nominations from the Metal Hammer Golden God Awards, but has not received an award; Nightwish already won awards from MTV Europe Music Awards and from World Music Awards.

Current members
Tuomas Holopainen
Active: 1996–present
Instruments: Keyboards, piano, male vocals (1996–1998)
Albums with the band: All Nightwish releases since the first 1996 demo
Holopainen (born 25 December 1976) is a Finnish composer, musician, poet and music producer. Known best for heavy metal music, he has also studied jazz and classical styles, but he didn't appreciate these styles explaining to be influenced by harmonic film music. Holopainen has written several songs that have been included in movie soundtracks, including a collaboration with Nightwish bass player, and male vocalist, Marko Hietala on "While Your Lips Are Still Red", for the Finnish film "Lieksa!" in 2007. He has revealed that he is working on another "movie project", but that he couldn't reveal anything about it yet. This project may have been the Imaginaerum movie.

Emppu Vuorinen
Active: 1996–present
Instruments: Guitars, bass (1997)
Albums with the band: All Nightwish releases since the first 1996 demo
Vuorinen (born 24 June 1978) is a Finnish guitarist. He started to play guitar as a private study at the age of 12 and since then he has played in various bands including Nightwish, of which he is a founding member, Brother Firetribe, Almah (with Angra's frontman Edu Falaschi) and Altaria. As of 2008 one of his side-projects Brother Firetribe released their two albums, False Metal (Re-released as Break Out), and Heart Full Of Fire worldwide.

Troy Donockley
Active: 2013–present (touring & session member 2007–2013)
Instruments: Uilleann pipes, tin whistle, bouzouki, backing vocals, guitars
Albums with the band: All Nightwish releases since 2007 album, Dark Passion Play
Donockley (born 30 May 1964) is an English composer and multi-instrumentalist most known for his playing of uillean pipes. He has performed on Dark Passion Play and Imaginaerum so far. He accompanied the band on most of their Dark Passion Play tour and is featured on the music video for the single "The Islander". When the band released their latest album Imaginaerum in 2011, he was asked to play a wide array of instruments including, uillean pipes, celtic bouzouki, tin and low whistles and was even asked to supply some Cumbrian chanting on the song, "The Crow, The Owl, and the Dove." He also joined the band on the Imaginaerum World Tour. On 9 October 2013, he was confirmed as a full-time member of Nightwish.

Floor Jansen
Active: 2013–present (touring member 2012–2013)
Instruments: Lead vocals
Albums with the band: All Nightwish releases since 2015 album, Endless Forms Most Beautiful
Jansen (born 21 February 1981) is a Dutch soprano singer, who was the lead singer of the symphonic metal band After Forever which disbanded in 2009, and the singer for ReVamp which disbanded in 2016. She is also a member of supergroup Star One. She started touring with Nightwish on 1 October 2012 when Anette parted from the band. She was originally scheduled to play with the band until the end of the Imaginaerum World Tour. On 9 October 2013, she was confirmed as the new full-time lead vocalist for Nightwish. Jansen's side-project Northward released their first album in October 2018.

 Kai Hahto
Active: 2019–present (touring & session member 2014–2019)
Instruments: Drums, Hand percussion
Albums with the band: All Nightwish releases since 2015 album, Endless Forms Most Beautiful

Hahto stepped in to record the drums for the new Nightwish album, replacing Jukka Nevalainen, who went on hiatus from the band due to insomnia, and performed on all live shows to date. In July 2019, Nevalainen announced he will not be returning to the band, as Hahto had become Nightwish's full-time drummer. Prior to replacing Nevalainen, Hahto was Nevalainen's Drum tech as well as playing in the band Wintersun.

 Jukka Koskinen
Active: 2022–present (touring & session member 2021–2022)
Instruments: Bass
Albums with the band: N/A

Koskinen was announced to perform with the band on tour throughout 2021 and 2022. On August 21, 2022, he was announced to be the new bass player for Nightwish.

Former members
Sami Vänskä
Active: 1998–2001
Instruments: Bass
Albums with the band: Oceanborn until Over the Hills and Far Away
Sami (born 26 September 1976) started playing bass as a private study. He has played in a few bands which have been mostly from the metal genre. He started his career in the band Nattvindens Gråt, with Tuomas Holopainen. He made 2 albums, A Bard's Tale (1995), Chaos Without Theory (1997) and a demo, Dar Svanar Flyger (1995), with them. He joined Nightwish for the second studio album, Oceanborn, and was soon replaced by Marko Hietala.
Tarja Turunen
Active: 1996–2005
Instruments: Lead vocals
Albums with the band: the first 1996 demo until Once
Tarja (born 17 August 1977) is a Finnish singer-songwriter, composer and actress, whose work includes eight solo albums. She was dismissed from the band on 22 October 2005 after nine years, in the end of the Once Upon a Tour. In 2006, Tarja released a Christmas album, Henkäys Ikuisuudesta, with a support classical tour between 25 November and 26 December. Since 2007, she has been active as successful solo performer with her own band.
Anette Olzon
Active: 2007–2012
Instruments: Lead vocals
Albums with the band: Dark Passion Play and Imaginaerum
Olzon (born 21 June 1971) is a Swedish singer, she replaced Tarja Turunen after her dismissal on 21 October 2005. Olzon was formerly the vocalist in the Swedish AOR band Alyson Avenue. After her admission in Nightwish, Anette played with several bands, in studio and live, including Brother Firetribe and Pain, and will release a new album in the near future, under her own name. Anette's departure from Nightwish was announced on 1 October 2012, midway through their North American tour, and Floor Jansen took over on vocals for the remainder of the Imaginaerum World Tour.
Jukka Nevalainen
Active: 1997–2019 (on hiatus August 2014 – July 2019)
Instruments: Drums
Albums with the band: All Nightwish releases since the first 1997 album, Angels Fall First up to Imaginaerum
Nevalainen (born 21 April 1978) is a Finnish drummer. He spent his early years in the city of Kitee; his drumming career started at the age of eleven when his music teacher at school told him that a new educational program for music was opening, and he thought Nevalainen would fit in well as a drummer. His first band was "The Highway" but he joined his first real band at the age of 15–16. The band had a rehearsal place, but was restricted to practice only a couple of days a week. After he left that band, he joined up with Erno "Emppu" Vuorinen and they got a permanent practice place. Nevalainen announced his departure from the band in July 2019 after being on hiatus from 2014 due to persistent insomnia. Kai Hahto who had previously filled in for Nevalainen for the 2015 album and the subsequent world tours has replaced Nevalainen.
Marko Hietala
Active: 2002–2021
Instruments: Bass, acoustic guitar, male vocals, multi-neck guitar
Albums with the band: All Nightwish releases since 2002 album, Century Child up to Human. :II: Nature.
Hietala (born 14 January 1966) is a Finnish bassist and vocalist, he is often seen as an icon for the Finnish metal scene. He is also the vocalist and bassist as well as composer/lyricist for heavy metal band Tarot. He joined Nightwish following the departure of previous bassist Sami Vänskä. He was a prominent guest musician in Delain, a project involving many members of the gothic/symphonic metal community. Marko is the bassist and lends his voice to a number of songs. He also participated in the recording of Invitation, by Altaria, providing backing vocals. Hietala has also been part of the bands Sinergy and Northern Kings. In Delain, Hietala played the bass for the album Lucidity and was also the main male vocalist on the album. He is also featured as vocalist in two of the songs on Delain's new album April Rain. In March 2009, Marko joined the band Sapattivuosi, they cover Black Sabbath songs in Finnish.
On January 12, 2021, Marko announced his retirement from the band and from the music industry.

Timeline

Guest appearances

References

External links
Nightwish's Official Website

 
Lists of members by band